This article lists people whose artwork has been featured on stamps of the United States. For this purpose "featured" is not limited to complete works but includes any identifiable representation of their works. Thus the "Geophysical Year" stamp of 1958 is considered to feature the work of Michelangelo because it shows two hands from his The Creation of Adam. The "issue year" refers to the year when that person's work listed appeared on a stamp of the United States. Many artists have had the same work appear on different U.S. postages stamps and many artists have had multiple works appear on U.S. postage stamps.

The list does not include artists who were commissioned by the U.S. Post Office Department (or its successor, the United States Postal Service) to specifically create artwork for a postage stamp. Scenes from American history, famous Americans, and traditional Christmas images are postage stamp themes frequently employing original artwork.

The main references for the list are: National Postal Museum online database "Arago: Philately", the Colnect Worldwide Stamp Catalog, and the US Stamp Gallery.

See also
 For a list of persons portrayed on U.S. stamps see People on stamps of the United States.
 Presidents of the United States on U.S. postage stamps

References

External links
American Art On Postage Stamps: Telling The Story of A Nation

Artwork
Postage
Artwork